Frederick James Massey  (2 November 1883 –1935) was an English footballer who played for Leyton, Tottenham Hotspur and West Ham United.

Football career 
Massey, an inside right, began his career at Leyton before joining Tottenham Hotspur in 1908. He played one match for the "Lilywhites". In 1909, he was transferred to West Ham United.

References

1883 births
1953 deaths
Footballers from East Ham
English footballers
English Football League players
Southern Football League players
Tottenham Hotspur F.C. players
West Ham United F.C. players
Leyton F.C. players
Association football forwards